Étang d'Araing is a lake in Couserans, Ariège department, France. At an elevation of 1909 m, its surface area is 0.33 km².

Araing